Spanish Town railway station opened in 1845 and closed in 1992 when all passenger services in Jamaica abruptly ceased. It provided rail services to Kingston and Montego Bay, Port Antonio, Ewarton and New Works. It is on the list of designated National Heritage Sites in Jamaica.

Architecture
The station was built in 1845 in Jamaica Georgian style from brick on a stone base. The roof overhang is supported by timber posts in wall mounted cast iron brackets on its northern side and by wall mounted timber brackets on its southern side. It has sash windows, solid recessed panel doors and a long zinc hip roof.

In 2003 it was reported as being in "very poor condition" and "in need of major repairs".

Track layout
In addition to the station and its single, twin sided platform there were sidings, an engine shed and a junction between the Kingston to Montego Bay main line and the Spanish Town to Ewarton branch.

Fares
In 1910 the third class fare from Spanish Town to Kingston was 1/- (one shillings); first class was about double.

See also
Railway stations in Jamaica

References

External links
Aerial view

Railway stations in Jamaica
Buildings and structures in Saint Catherine Parish
Railway stations opened in 1845
Railway stations closed in 1992
Railway station

Railway stations in Jamaica opened in 1845